Piloncitos (also known as bulawan, and as "granitos de oro" in very early records) are small "bead-like" pieces of gold which were used as currency during the Philippines' Archaic period and in the earliest years of the country's Spanish colonial period. These gold pieces have been excavated from sites throughout the Philippine archipelago: Mandaluyong, Bataan, the banks of the Pasig River, Batangas, and Marinduque in Luzon; Samar and Leyte in the Visayas; and in some areas in Mindanao.

The term "Piloncitos" is a contemporary word, used by modern day antique collectors, who thought that the cone-shaped pieces looked like a pilon of sugar. Early historical descriptions of the term include the spanish "granitas de oro" (small grains of gold), or simply by whatever local language terms were used to mean "gold" in those times, such as "bulawan."

Piloncitos are presumably an offshoot of silver coinage and may have evolved into the bullet or pod duang coinage of Sukhothai in Thailand.

Historical usage

Early historical records document the extensive use of gold throughout the Philippine archipelago before the arrival of European colonists. It was used extensively as currency, and also used in everyday items such as clothing and finery.

Both ancient and modern goldsmiths exude exquisiteness in their craftsmanship for trade, personal vanity and prestige.

Piloncitos are the earliest form of precious metal based currency of Tondo, Namayan and Rajahnate of Butuan in present-day Philippines. It is likely made of pure gold with a weight ranging between 0.5 grams to more or less than 3 grams.

Piloncitos are tiny engraved bead-like gold bits unearthed in the Philippines. They are the first recognized coinage in the Philippines circulated between the 9th and 12th centuries. They emerged when increasing trade made barter inconvenient.

Descriptions
Piloncitos are so small—some are of the size of a corn kernel—and weigh from 0.09 to 2.65 grams of fine gold. Large piloncitos weighing 2.65 grams approximate the weight of one mass. Piloncitos have been excavated from Mandaluyong, Bataan, the banks of the Pasig River, Batangas, Marinduque, Samar, Leyte and some areas in Mindanao. They have been found in large numbers in Indonesian archeological sites leading to questions of origin. That gold was mined and worked in the Philippines is evidenced by many Spanish accounts, like one in 1586 that stated:

Similarities in neighboring countries
Piloncitos are not exclusively found in the Philippines as most collectors and local historians state. Similar type of gold can be found in some regions of Indonesia which they call massa.

Origins
In an era before coined money was widely used, Indo-Pacific beads were made first at a site called Arikamedu in South India ca. 200 BC. The manufacture then moved in sequence to Ceylon, South Thailand, Java and finally Malaya. By about 1200–1300 AD the larger Majapahit beads, excavated today in the interior of Java, had supplanted it. Since these factory sites have been dated, archaeologists now use the beads to date sites, though whether beads rose to the level of metals, salt, cloth, and cowries as "standard" trade goods is uncertain.

The first indigenous metallic coinage in the region, ca. 750–850 AD, comes from the Javanese kingdom of Sailendra (Chinese: Ho-ling). These roughly dome-shaped silver of irregular weight bore stamps of a flowing vase, and the sandalwood flower (quatefoil). By 850 AD weights had been standardized at 20 rattis to a Massa of about 2.4 grams. Silver and gold coins of Massa and fractional denominations were issued until about 1300 AD, with changes in shape and quality of inscription marking periods of issue. The gold piloncitos of the Philippines are a late offshoot of the gold coinage, while the bean-like silver "namo" series, of the Malay isthmus was presumably an offshoot of the silver coinage and may have evolved into the bullet coins of Siam.

See also
 Barter rings
 Philippine peso
 Philippine real
 List of historical currencies
 History of Philippine money
 Photduang, a similar currency used in Siam

References

External links
Central Bank of the Philippines – Money museum

Ancient currencies
Medieval currencies
Modern obsolete currencies
Philippines currency history
1852 disestablishments